Kranichstein is a district in the city of Darmstadt. The town started with housing construction in the 1960s and now also has a number of residential high-rises. Often referred to as Darmstadt-Kranichstein.

Geographical location
Kranichstein is located in the northeast of Darmstadt. It borders on Darmstadt-Wixhausen in the north, on Darmstadt-Ost in the southeast, on Darmstadt-Nord in the southwest and on Darmstadt-Arheilgen in the west.

History

Due to the close geographic location to Arheilgen, the prehistoric history is certainly to be regarded as the same.

Middle Ages

On May 6, 1399, the first mention of the Einsiedel-Rod on Messeler Weg appeared, which was later named Kranich-Rod or Kranich-Rotth, after its owner Henne Cranich zu Dirmstein , derived from the German word for clearing "Rodung". Kranichstein is also the name of Jagdschloss Kranichstein. It was originally built in 1578 for Landgrave Georg I of Hesse-Darmstadt. The palace is one of the few preserved baroque hunters' courtyards in Germany. Today the facility houses a hunting museum and a hotel with restaurant.
Landgrave Ernst Ludwig (1667–1739) and Louis VIII (1691–1768) also made use of the Kranichstein hunting lodge.

Modern times

In May 1968, the “Neu-Kranichstein” urban development project, which was relatively large for Darmstadt, was started; the designs came from Ernst May. The design provided for a city expansion for 18,000 residents in the form of a forest satellite. Of the four planned construction phases, only the smallest was initially implemented. It is named after the nearby hunting lodge, the former summer residence of the Darmstadt landgraves and grand dukes. From the beginning, the overall planning included the construction of the Bürgerpark with artificial hills and several ponds that were created in the former clay pits, as well as Lake Brentano.
Kranichstein is known for its passive houses, (Passivhaus in German) this refers to the voluntary standard for energy efficiency in a building, reducing its ecological footprint

Transportation

Kranichstein is serviced by the public transport streetcars line 4 and 5 with service to the downtown Darmstadt. Additionally, there is a bus connection with the lines H and U to the downtown Darmstadt. Kranichstein has train service to Darmstadt main station and to Wiesbaden and Mainz Hauptbahnhof on regional train line 75, called the Rhein-Main-Bahn . Rail routes: RB 15703, RB 15707, RB 15708, RB 15712, and STR 5 also serve the Kranichstein rail stop, with Busline A Darmstadt. Bus line H and U serve the town.

Darmstadt-Kranichstein Railway Museum is as very large railway museum with some operational historical working Steam locomotives.

Boroughs of Darmstadt
Darmstadt has 9 official 'Stadtteile' (boroughs). These are, alphabetically:

 Darmstadt-Arheilgen
Darmstadt-Bessungen
Darmstadt-Eberstadt
Darmstadt-Kranichstein
Darmstadt-Mitte ('Central')
Darmstadt-Nord ('North')
Darmstadt-Ost ('East')
Darmstadt-West ('West')
Darmstadt-Wixhausen

References

External links

 Official website of the city of Darmstadt (German and parts in English)
Map of the City of Darmstadt-Arheilgen, with bus and tram stops
First Passive House Kranichstein

Kranichstein